pipes|drums is an independent, not-for-profit publication for Highland pipers and pipe band drummers. A combination of free and subscription-based content, the site is the world's most frequented news and features outlet serving piping and drumming.

pipes|drums started in 1995 as "Piper & Drummer Online," one of the first significant websites for the Scottish musical arts. The site was originally an independent offshoot of the Piper & Drummer, a quarterly print publication produced by the Pipers & Pipe Band Society of Ontario until March 2006. The online magazine serves the world competing piping and drumming community of approximately 75,000, according to a recent estimate conducted by the National Piping Centre in Glasgow, Scotland.

pipes|drums is cited as a source in numerous scholarly works, including Dr. William Donaldson's seminal book, The Highland Pipe and Scottish Society. The magazine is the largest online repository of articles on piping and drumming in the world. pipes|drums has provided fodder for stories in, among other media outlets, BBC News, The Scotsman, and telegraph.co.uk.

Notes

External links
pipes|drums website
 
 
 
Pipers & Pipe Band Society of Ontario
National Piping Centre

Bagpiping
Celtic music